Lev Feliksovich Lagorio (Russian: Лев Феликсович Лагорио; 9 December 1826, Feodosia - 17 November 1905, Saint Petersburg) was a Russian painter and watercolorist, known primarily for his seascapes and maritime scenes. He was associated with the "Cimmerian" school of painting, composed of artists who worked in Southern Crimea.

Biography
Lev Feliksovich was born in Feodosia in the family of the Neapolitan vice-consul. His father, Felice Lagorio (1781-1857) was a Genoese merchant serving as Vice-Consul for the Kingdom of the Two Sicilies. From 1839 to 1840, he received his first artistic training in the studios of Ivan Aivazovsky. Later, he was able to obtain financial assistance from the Duke of Leuchtenberg, the Academy's new President. Among his teachers there were Alexander Sauerweid, Maxim Vorobiev and Bogdan Willewalde.

In 1850 Lagorio graduated from the Academy of Arts with a gold medal. In 1850, he received the title of "Artist" for his painting "View of Lakhta" and, two years later, became a Russian citizen. He was also awarded a pension to study abroad, visiting Paris first (1853), then Rome, where he stayed until 1859, the last two years at his own expense.

After his return, in 1860, he was named a Professor and exhibited the works he had created in Italy. He travelled to the Caucasus in 1861 and presented a series of landscapes from there to Tsar Alexander II, who presented him with the Order of Saint Anna.

He returned to the Caucasus in 1863 and 1864, with the entourage of Grand Duke Mikhail Nikolayevich, where he participated in the Caucasian War. Afterward he settled in Saint Petersburg, spent the summers in Sudak and often travelled abroad.

In 1885, he was commissioned to paint a series of works on the Russo-Turkish War of 1877-1878 and visited battlefields throughout the European and Asian theaters. In 1900, he was named an honorary member of the Academy. He is buried at Novodevichy Cemetery.

Selected paintings

References

Further reading
 N.O. Mayorova and G.K. Skokov, Лев Лагорио: история жизненного пути, творческое наследие, (History of his Life and Creative Heritage), Белый город, 2006

External links

ArtNet: More works by Lagorio.
I.K. Aivazovsky National Feodosia Art Gallery
Лагорио Лев Феликсович
Гайдук Т. В. Лагоріо Лев Феліксович // Енциклопедія Сучасної України

19th-century painters from the Russian Empire
Russian male painters
20th-century Russian painters
Russian landscape painters
1828 births
1905 deaths
People from Feodosia
Russian marine artists
Recipients of the Order of St. Anna
Burials at Novodevichy Cemetery (Saint Petersburg)
Russian people of Italian descent